Meirelles may refer to the following Brazilian people:

 Fernando Meirelles (born 1955), film director
 Francinilson Meirelles (born 1990), footballer
 Henrique Meirelles (born 1945), banker and politician
 Jacqueline Meirelles (born 1963), model and TV host
 J. T. Meirelles (1940–2008), bossa nova, samba and jazz musician
 Nelson Meirelles, musician in O Rappa, a reggae/rock band
 Priscilla Meirelles (born 1983), model
 Victor Meirelles (1832–1903), painter

See also
 Meireles

Portuguese-language surnames